The molecular formula C27H40O4 (molar mass: 428.60 g/mol, exact mass: 428.2927 u) may refer to:

 AM-938
 Hydroxyprogesterone caproate (OHPC)
 Testosterone hexahydrobenzylcarbonate

Molecular formulas